Taza Mahalla Mosque (which can also be transliterated as Teze Mehelle in English) is an Azerbaijani mosque located in Shusha about 350 km from capital Baku. The name of the mosque in translation means "New Neighbourhood" referring to the location of the mosque in the relatively new neighborhood of 17 neighbourhoods Shusha. These neighbourhoods were Boyuk qurdlar, Kichik Qurdlar, Sеyidli, Julfalar, Taza mahalla, Hamam gabaghi, Demirchiler, Guyulug, Khoja Marjanli, Mamayı, Saatlı, Kocharli, Mеrdinli, Chol gala, Haji Yusifli, Chukhur mahalla, Agha dedeliler. The mosque was one of the 17 mosques functioning in Shusha by the end of the 19th century. It was located on Firudin bey Kocharli street of Taza Mahalla neighborhood of Shusha.

See also

 List of mosques in Nagorno-Karabakh
 Yukhari Govhar Agha Mosque
 Ashaghi Govhar Agha Mosque
 Saatli Mosque
 Seyidli Mosque
 Khoja Marjanli Mosque
 Guyulug Mosque

References

External links

 Karabakh Monuments

Mosques in Shusha
18th-century mosques